Charles William Johnson (February 12, 1917 – April 11, 1993) was an American skeleton racer who competed in the late 1940s. He finished tenth in the skeleton event at the 1948 Winter Olympics in St. Moritz.

References
Skeletonsport.com results

1917 births
1993 deaths
American male skeleton racers
Olympic skeleton racers of the United States
Skeleton racers at the 1948 Winter Olympics